Fitzharris may refer to:

Edward Fitzharris (1648?-1681),  an Anglo-Irish conspirator. He was prosecuted for his involvement in alleged Popish Plot.
Sean Fitzharris (born 1991), a Scottish football player, who is without a club after being released by Greenock Morton.

See also
Fitzharris Baronets